Nemacheilus monilis, the spotted loach, is a species of ray-finned fish in the genus Nemacheilus which is endemic to the southern Western Ghats in the Indian states of Kerala and Tamil Nadu. It occurs in fast flowing water, even in rapids, over substrates consisting of pebbles and cobble substrates. It occasionally is collected and exported for the aquarium trade.

References

 

M
Fish described in 1921